A nanosecond (ns) is a unit of time in the International System of Units (SI) equal to one billionth of a second, that is,  of a second, or 10 seconds.

The term combines the SI prefix nano- indicating a 1 billionth submultiple of an SI unit (e.g. nanogram, nanometre, etc.) and second, the primary unit of time in the SI.

A nanosecond is equal to 1000 picoseconds or  microsecond.  Time units ranging between 10 and 10 seconds are typically expressed as tens or hundreds of nanoseconds.

Time units of this granularity are commonly found in telecommunications, pulsed lasers, and related aspects of electronics.

Common measurements 
 0.001 nanoseconds – one picosecond
 0.5 nanoseconds – the half-life of beryllium-13.
 0.96 nanoseconds – 100 Gigabit Ethernet Interpacket gap
 1.0 nanosecond – cycle time of an electromagnetic wave with a frequency of 1 GHz (1 hertz).   
 1.0 nanosecond – electromagnetic wavelength of 1 light-nanosecond. Equivalent to 0.3m radio band.
  nanoseconds (by definition) –  time taken by light to travel 1 foot in a vacuum.
  nanoseconds (by definition) – time taken by light to travel 1 metre in a vacuum.
 8 nanoseconds - typical propagation delay of 74HC series logic chips based on HCMOS technology, commonly used for digital electronics in the mid-1980s.
 10 nanoseconds – one "shake", (as in a "shake of a lamb's tail") approximate time of one generation of a nuclear chain reaction with fast neutrons
 10 nanoseconds – cycle time for frequency 100 MHz (1 hertz), radio wavelength 3 m (VHF, FM band)
 10 nanoseconds – half-life of lithium-12
 12 nanoseconds – mean lifetime of a charged K meson
 20–40 nanoseconds – time of fusion reaction in a hydrogen bomb
 30 nanoseconds – half-life of carbon-21
 77 nanoseconds – a sixth (a 60th of a 60th of a 60th of a 60th of a second)
 96 nanoseconds – Gigabit Ethernet Interpacket gap
 100 nanoseconds – cycle time for frequency 10 MHz, radio wavelength 30 m (shortwave)
 299 nanoseconds – half-life of polonium-212
 333 nanoseconds – cycle time of highest medium wave radio frequency, 3 MHz
 500 nanoseconds – T1 time of Josephson phase qubit (see also Qubit) as of May 2005
 1,000 nanoseconds – one microsecond

See also 
 International System of Units
 Jiffy (time)
 Microsecond
 Millisecond
 Orders of magnitude (time)
 Picosecond
 Second

References 
Notes

Citations

External links
Visual representation of a nanosecond Grace Hopper explains the nanosecond

Orders of magnitude (time)